Rusty Shoop, born in Dallas, Texas, is a retired meteorologist for American TV station KERO-TV.

He is married with four adult children and seven grandchildren.

As of February 25, 2008, he is also a novelist with the publishing of Blood Harvest .

Career
Rusty Shoop joined the United States Air Force, ending up in Northern California after his four-year tour of duty. At Humboldt State University he became the weatherman at KIEM-TV in Eureka, California, where his brother, Larry, was the anchorman.

Rusty came to Bakersfield, California in 1984.  He became weatherman and worked with anchorman Burleigh Smith on KERO-TV.

In addition to television, Rusty has worked as a truck driver, a small business owner, and an insurance company executive.

On January 5 of 2007, Rusty suffered a brain aneurysm. He put his television career on hold while recovering.  During this time he polished a novel he had written 9 years prior, and published it February 25, 2008.  Blood Harvest  is about a fictitious news anchorman who investigates a murder.

Aneurysm
After suffering an intense headache for two days, Rusty's wife insisted he see a doctor. Dr. Luis Cousin sent him to the hospital immediately.  Testing revealed that an artery in his brain had ruptured.  Neuro-surgeon Dr. Mahmoud Rashidi performed surgery within a few hours of Rusty's arrival at the hospital.

Rusty is enthusiastic about sharing this life changing event; his doctor told him that only about 30% of aneurysm victims survive without life altering problems or even death. Rusty believes there is a divine purpose to his survival and good recovery. His “brain attack” convinced him that...

References

People from Bakersfield, California
Military personnel from Dallas
American television journalists
Living people
Year of birth missing (living people)
United States Air Force officers
American male journalists
Journalists from California
Journalists from Texas
Military personnel from California